The  was a "Rapid" limited-stop suburban rail service in Greater Tokyo operated since April 1991 until March 2018 by East Japan Railway Company (JR East). Only trains heading towards Narita Airport were identified as Airport Narita; those on the return journey towards Tokyo were unnamed.

Route

Kurihama → Ōfuna → Tokyo
See Yokosuka Line for local trains.

Tokyo → Kinshichō → Chiba
See Sōbu Line (Rapid) for rapid trains.

Chiba → Sakura → Narita → Narita Airport Terminal 1
 -  -  -  -  -  -  -  -

Rolling stock

All Airport Narita services were operated using E217 series electric multiple unit (EMU) trains.

History
The Airport Narita rapid services were introduced from 20 April 1991 to supplement the popular Narita Express limited express services which commenced the previous month. Initially, 16 services ran in each direction daily, using 113 series EMU formations based at Ōfuna and Makuhari depots. Trains including SaRo 124 Green (first class) cars were allocated to these services, as these had expanded luggage storage space.

From the start of the revised timetable on 17 March 2018, the name Airport Narita was discontinued on rapid services to Narita Airport, in order to avoid confusion with the limited express Narita Express services which also serve Narita International Airport.

See also
 Narita Express limited express service between destinations in the Tokyo area and Narita Airport
 List of named passenger trains of Japan

References

Named passenger trains of Japan
Airport rail links in Japan
Rail transport in Tokyo
Railway lines in Kanagawa Prefecture
Rail transport in Chiba Prefecture
East Japan Railway Company
Railway services introduced in 1991
Railway services discontinued in 2018
Narita International Airport
1991 establishments in Japan
2018 disestablishments in Japan